The Mackinac Republican Leadership Conference, also known as the Midwest Mackinac Republican Leadership Conference is a biennial United States Republican Party political conference held on Mackinac Island, Michigan.

The conference was first founded in 1953.

Dates
2021: September 24-26, 2021 - "All in Michigan"
2019: September 20–22, 2019 - "Growth, Opportunity, Prosperity"
2017: September 22–24, 2017 - "Together We Rise"
2015: September 18–20, 2015 – "Michigan: Foundation For the Future"
2013: September 20–22, 2013 - 30th event
2011: September 23–25, 2011
2009: September 25–27, 2009
2007: September 21–23, 2007 – "Relying on our Roots"
2005: September 23–25, 2005 – "Make Every Day Count"
2003: September 18–21, 2003
2001: September 21–23, 2001
1999: September 17–19, 1999

Notable Guests
2021 (attended): RNC Chairwoman Ronna Romney McDaniel; Senator Ted Cruz; Senator Lindsey Graham; South Dakota Governor Kristi Noem; Rep. Nancy Mace
2021 (invited): Vice President Mike Pence; RNC Chairwoman Ronna Romney McDaniel; Senator Ted Cruz; Senator Lindsey Graham; UN Ambassador Nikki Haley; South Dakota Governor Kristi Noem; Rep. Nancy Mace
2019: Rep. Dan Crenshaw; Education Secretary Betsy DeVos; Republican leader Kevin McCarthy; Vice President Mike Pence; former Mississippi Governor Haley Barbour
2017 (attended): RNC Chairwoman Ronna Romney McDaniel; Education Secretary Betsy DeVos, Missouri Gov. Eric Greitens, Utah Congressman Jason Chaffetz, former Michigan governor John Engler, Kentucky governor Matt Bevin, House Majority leader Kevin McCarthy.  
2017 (invited): RNC Chairwoman Ronna Romney McDaniel; President Donald Trump, Vice President Mike Pence, Education Secretary Betsy DeVos, UN Ambassador Nikki Haley, New Mexico Gov. Susana Martinez; Missouri Gov. Eric Greitens, Utah Congressman Jason Chaffetz, former Michigan governor John Engler, Kentucky governor Matt Bevin, House Majority leader Kevin McCarthy.
2015 (attended): Jeb Bush, Senator Ted Cruz, Carly Fiorina, Governor John Kasich, Senator Rand Paul, Governor Rick Snyder
2015 (invited): Jeb Bush, Senator Ted Cruz, Carly Fiorina, Governor Scott Walker, Governor John Kasich, Senator Rand Paul, Governor Rick Snyder
2013 (attended): Karl Rove, Senator Rand Paul, Governor Scott Walker, Governor Bobby Jindal, Reince Priebus, Senator John Thune
2013 (invited): Congressman Paul Ryan, Karl Rove, Congressman Sean Duffy, Senator Marco Rubio, Governor Jeb Bush, Senator Rand Paul, Governor Scott Walker, Mayor Mia Love, Speaker John Boehner
2011: Mitt Romney, Rick Perry, Nikki Haley, Susana Martinez, Reince Priebus, Rick Snyder, Thaddeus McCotter
2009: Mitt Romney, Tim Pawlenty, Ari Fleischer, Congressman Eric Cantor, Governor John Engler
2007: Duncan Hunter, Rudy Giuliani, Tom Tancredo, Ron Paul, Sam Brownback, Newt Gingrich, Mike Huckabee, Mitt Romney, Fred Thompson, John McCain
2005: Sam Brownback, Mitt Romney
2003: Lynne Cheney, Ken Mehlman
1999: Gary Bauer, Alan Keys, Steve Forbes, Vern Ehlers
1997: Newt Gingrich, John Kasich, Spencer Abraham, Jim Nicholson
1995: Bob Dole, Newt Gingrich, Phil Gramm
1987: Pat Robertson, Bob Dole
1985: Bob Dole, Jack Kemp, James Baker

References

External links
2021 Conference Site
2019 Conference Site

Republican Party (United States) events in Michigan
Mackinac Island
Politics of Michigan